Blue is the sixth studio album by British band Simply Red. It was released by East West Records on 19 May 1998 in the United Kingdom. Initially conceived as a cover album, it features production from lead singer Mick Hucknall as well as Andy Wright, Gota Yashiki, Stevie J, and Joe "Jake" Carter. Hucknall, Wright, and Yashiki are the only musicians featured in the Blue CD booklet's photography; this is a first for a Simply Red album, as all prior albums featured photos of the various band members credited.

The album includes five cover versions: "Mellow My Mind" from the 1975 Neil Young album Tonight's the Night; two versions of the frequently covered "The Air That I Breathe", written by Albert Hammond and Mike Hazlewood; the Gregory Isaacs hit "Night Nurse"; and "Ghetto Girl" by Dennis Brown, from whom the band would cover another song in 2003. New versions of previously recorded Simply Red songs also appear here: "Come Get Me Angel" is a rewritten version of the 1996 single "Angel" (an Aretha Franklin cover), and "Broken Man" was first released as a B-side in 1987. "The Air That I Breathe Reprise" samples "Jack and Diane" by John Mellencamp. "So Jungiful", found on the Japanese edition of the album, is a jungle remix of "So Beautiful" from the band's previous album, Life.

Critical reception

AllMusic editor Stephen Thomas Erlewine found that Blue "is weak on original material. However, Mick Hucknall makes up for the deficits by assembling a good collection of outside material [...] Initially, Blue was going to be a covers album, and judging by these numbers [...] it would have been a great, sultry listen. Instead, he's followed through on an album that accentuates his weaknesses as a writer. Granted, he can oversing on occasion, but if Blue does anything, it proves that his voice is his greatest talent and that he should dedicate himself to material that serves it well."

Track listing

Notes
  signifies an additional producer

Personnel 
Simply Red
 Mick Hucknall – lead vocals, backing vocals 
 Tim Vine – keyboards 
 Andy Wright – programming 
 Mark Jaimes – guitars 
 Steve Lewinson – bass
 Velroy Bailey – drums 
 Gota Yashiki – drums, programming 
 Ian Kirkham – saxophones
 John Johnson – trombone 
 Sarah Brown – backing vocals
 Dee Johnson – backing vocals 

Additional musicians
 Paul Carrack – keyboards 
 Alan Clark – keyboards 
 Robbie Lyn – keyboards 
 Ned Douglas – programming
 Stephen Hilton – programming
 Aidan Love – programming 
 Kenji Jammer – guitars 
 Tony Remy – guitars 
 Bub Roberts – guitars 
 Lloyd "Gitsy" Willis – guitars 
 Robbie Shakespeare – bass
 CJ Taylor – bass 
 Sly Dunbar – drums
 Geoff Holroyde – drums 
 Mike Greenwood – trumpet, flugelhorn
 David Whitaker – orchestra arrangements and conductor 
 Pro Arte Orchestra of London – orchestra
 Tru Indeed – backing vocals (7)

Production 
 AGM – album producers
 Stevie J – co-producer (7)
 Roland Herrington – recording 
 Femi Jiya – recording 
 John Lee – recording, mix engineer 
 Alex Marou – recording 
 Lynford "Fatta" Marshall – recording 
 Dave Tyler – recording 
 Ted Wohlson – recording 
 Paul Logas – mix engineer, mixing (7)
 Tony Maserati – mix engineer, mixing (7)
 Ali Staton – mix engineer
 Douglas Blair – assistant engineer
 Jake Davies – assistant engineer 
 Andrew Dudman – assistant engineer 
 Ricky Graham – assistant engineer 
 Derek Grey – assistant engineer 
 Neil Mason – assistant engineer 
 Dave Russell – assistant engineer 
 Andy Scade – assistant engineer 
 Mak Togashi – assistant engineer 
 Mick Hucknall – mixing (1-5, 8-12)
 Andy Wright – mixing (1, 2, 8, 9, 12)
 Gota Yashiki – mixing (1-6, 8-10, 12)
 Kevin Metcalfe – mastering 
 Merv Pearson – pre-production programming 
 Intro – design 
 Carolyn Quartermaine – art direction, photography 
 Zanna – photography

Studios
 Recorded at Westpoint Recording Studios, Funny Bunny Studios, Whitfield Street Studios and Abbey Road Studios (London, UK); Archer Studios (Kingston, Jamaica); The Hit Factory (New York City, New York, USA).
 Mastered at The Town House (London, UK).

Charts

Weekly charts

Year-end charts

Certifications and sales

References

Simply Red albums
1998 albums
East West Records albums